The Gokbu Gong clan is one of the Korean clans originally from China. Their Bon-gwan are in Qufu, Shandong in China, which was also Confucius's birthplace. Qufu is known as Gokbu in Korean. According to the South Korean 2000 census, the number of individuals identifying with the Gokbu Gong clan was 74,135. The apical ancestor of the clan was Confucius.

In 1351, Kong Shao (孔紹, 1304-1381; known as 공소 [Gong So] in Korean), claimed to be one of the Duke Yansheng Kong Huan's (孔浣, 53rd generation descendant of Confucius) sons, and was naturalized in Goryeo as a fatherly master of Queen Noguk, who had an marriage to an ordinary person planned by Gongmin of Goryeo at the Yuan dynasty's Hanlin Academy. Kong Shao became a Menxia Shilang and was granted lands in the Changwon area. He subsequently became a middle founder of the Gokbu Gong clan.

Genealogy

– – – – – – - The dashed lines denote the adoptions

See also 
 Korean clan names of foreign origin
 Family tree of Confucius in the main line of descent  
 Duke Yansheng

References

External links 
 

 
Korean clan names of Chinese origin